The Crawl Cay boa is a dwarf Boa imperator population that reaches a maximum length of about 5 feet. Characteristics of this snake are the very gray background colour with black speckling which is also on the head. The snakes have saddling like the common boa, which continue onto the tail.

Their natural habitat is the island they are named after, Crawl Cay (pronounced ). Crawl Cay is off the east coast of Belize. Crawl Cay, a half-moon shaped cay five acres in size, is part of the Turneff Island Archipelago. Collecting snakes is prohibited as the Turneff Archipelago is now a National Reserve.

References

Boa (genus)
Reptiles of Belize